Cape Daniell is a cape at the northeast extremity of Daniell Peninsula which marks the south side of the entrance to Tucker Inlet, in Victoria Land. It was discovered January 15, 1841, by Sir James Clark Ross who named it for John Frederic Daniell, professor of chemistry at King's College London, and Foreign Secretary of the Royal Society.

References

 

Headlands of Victoria Land
Borchgrevink Coast